Rita Bhaduri (4 November 1955 – 17 July 2018) was an Indian film and television actress. she has also work in Gujarati cinema.

Career 
She initially appeared as supporting actress in various Bollywood films during the 1970s, 1980s, and 1990s.  She was most known for Sawan Ko Aane Do a 1979 Rajshri Productions film and Raja (1995) for which she received a Filmfare Award nomination for Best Supporting Actress. She had a supporting role as Julie's best friend in Julie (1975), where the song "Yeh Raatein Nayi Purani" was picturized on her. Her landmark role was in Malayalam film Kanyakumari opposite Kamal Hasan. Later her serial Grihalakshmi Ka Jinn was famous in 1995 to 1997 period. In 1996 she worked in Pyar Zindagi Hai along with Naveen Nischol and Raj Mohammed this was shot in Hyderabad.

She was from the 1973 batch of the Film and Television Institute of India (FTII), Pune and her batch included actress, Zarina Wahab.  Rita Bhaduri played the role of grandmother in the serial Nimki Mukhiya.

Her last role was in Nimki Mukhiya.

Death 
She died in Mumbai at the age of 62 while being treated at Mumbai's Sujay Hospital in Vile Parle for a kidney ailment.

Filmography

 2012 Kevi Rite Jaish (as Old lady)
 2003 Main Madhuri Dixit Banna Chahti Hoon (as Kalavati)
 2002 Dil Vil Pyar Vyar
 2002 Mulaqaat (as Mrs. Patkar)
 2000 Kya Kehna (as Ajay's mom)
 1999 Hote Hote Pyar Ho Gaya (as Asha)
 1998 Jaane Jigar (as Mrs. Prem Kishan)
 1997 Tamanna (as Mother Superior)
 1997 Hero No. 1 (as Mrs. Laxmi Vidya Nath)
 1997 Virasat (as Mausi)
 1996 Khoon Ki Pyasi (as Parvati)
 1996 Pyar Zindagi Hai
 1995 Aatank Hi Aatank (as Mrs. Shiv Charan Sharma)
 1995 Dance Party (as Mrs. Lajjo Sharma)
 1995 Inteqam Ke Sholay
 1995 Maa Ki Mamta (as Shanti)
 1995 Raja (as Sarita Garewal)
 1994 Stuntman (as Reena's mom)
 1994 Kabhi Haan Kabhi Naa (as Mary Sullivan)
 1993 Dalaal (as Mrs. Djun-Djun Wala)
 1993 Rang (as Mrs. Joshi)
 1993 Game (as Vikram's mom)
 1993 Aashik Awara (as Gayetri)
 1993 Insaniyat Ke Devta (as Sumitradevi (Ranjit's wife))
 1993 Anth (as Priya's mom)
 1992 Yudhpath (as Mrs. Choudhary)
 1992 Tilak
 1992 Ghar Jamai
 1992 Ajeeb Dastaan Hai Yeh (as School-teacher)
 1992 Beta (as Neeta)
 1991 Love (as Stella Pinto)
 1991 House No. 13 (as Shanti)
 1991 Khooni Panja
 1991 Ayee Milan Ki Raat
 1990 Teri Talash Mein (as Shanta D. Sandhu)
 1990 Ghar Ho To Aisa (as Kanchan)
 1990 Jungle Love (as Rani's Mother)
 1990 Nehru: The Jewel of India
 1990 Naya Khoon (as Sapna Srivastav)
 1989 Sindoor Aur Bandook
 1988 Rama O Rama (as Monu's Mother)
 1988 Ghar Mein Ram Gali Mein Shyam (as Mrs. Dharamchand)
 1987 Diljalaa (as dead child's mother)
 1986 Main Balwan (as Geeta, Tony's mother)
 1985 Phoolan Devi (1985 film) (as Phoolan)
 1984 Maya Bazaar (as Surekha)
 1983 Nastik (as Shanti) 
 1982 Bezubaan (as Revati, aka Meerabai)
 1982 Chalti Ka Naam Zindagi
 1981 Woh Phir Nahin Aaye (as Reeta Bhaduri)
 1981 Jagya Tyathi Sawaar
 1981 Garvi Naar Gujaratan
 1980 Gehrayee (as Chenni)
 1980 Unees-Bees
 1980 Hum Nahin Sudherenge
 1980 Khanjar
 1979 Raadha Aur Seeta (as Raadha S. Saxena)
 1979 Gopal Krishna (as Yashoda)
 1979 Nagin Aur Suhagan (as Gauri J. Singh/Kamla)
 1979 Sawan Ko Aane Do (as Gitanjali)
 1979 Kashino Dikro (as Rama)
 1978 College Girl
 1978 Vishwanath (as Munni)
 1978 Khoon Ki Pukaar (as Rani)
 1977 Aaina (as Poorna R. Shastri)
 1977 Din Amader
 1977 Kulvadhu
 1977 Anurodh (as Anju)
 1976 Udhar Ka Sindur (as Sudha - Premnath's sister)
 1976 - Lakho Fulani (Gujarati Movie)
 1975 Julie (as Usha Bhattacharya)
 1974 Kanyakumari (as Parvathi)
 1968 Teri Talash Mein

Television

References

External links
 
 Reeta Bhaduri at Bollywood Hungama

1955 births
2018 deaths
Indian film actresses
Indian television actresses
Actresses in Hindi cinema
Film and Television Institute of India alumni
Actresses from Uttar Pradesh
20th-century Indian actresses
21st-century Indian actresses
People from Indore